Rolls-Royce Motor Cars Limited is a British luxury automobile maker which has operated as a wholly owned subsidiary of BMW AG since 2003 – as the exclusive manufacturer of Rolls-Royce-branded motor cars. The company's administrative and production headquarters are located on the Goodwood Estate in Goodwood, West Sussex, England, United Kingdom.

From 1906 to 2003, motor cars were manufactured and marketed under the Rolls-Royce brand by Rolls-Royce Motors. The Rolls-Royce Motor Cars subsidiary of BMW AG has no direct relationship to Rolls-Royce-branded vehicles produced before 2003, other than having briefly supplied components and engines. The Bentley Motors Limited subsidiary of Volkswagen AG is the direct successor to Rolls-Royce Motors and various other predecessor entities that produced Rolls-Royce and Bentley branded cars between the foundation of each company and 2003, when the BMW-controlled entity started producing cars under the Rolls-Royce brand.

The BBC called Rolls-Royce "probably one of the most recognised icons in the world", and that "the name Rolls-Royce entered the English language as a superlative." A marketing survey in 1987 showed that only Coca-Cola was a more widely known brand than Rolls-Royce.

The company's line of vehicles includes the Phantom, a four-door saloon first offered in 2003 as well as its extended wheelbase two-door coupé and convertible variants; the smaller Ghost four-door saloon; Wraith two-door coupé; Dawn convertible; the Cullinan SUV, and the forthcoming 2023 Spectre, the first all-electric Rolls-Royce.

History

Rolls-Royce Motor Cars Limited was created as a wholly owned subsidiary of BMW in 1998 after BMW licensed the rights to the Rolls-Royce brand name and logo from Rolls-Royce Holdings plc, and acquired the rights to the Spirit of Ecstasy and Rolls-Royce grille shape trademarks from Volkswagen AG. Rolls-Royce Motor Cars Limited has been manufacturing Rolls-Royce branded cars since 2003.

Although the Rolls-Royce brand has been in use since 1906, the fate of the brand diverged between 1998 and 2003. In 2003, the Rolls-Royce Motor Cars subsidiary of BMW AG, which had been a major supplier to the brand up to 2003, began manufacturing vehicles with the Rolls-Royce name. Volkswagen AG took ownership of the Bentley name as well as previous Rolls-Royce production facilities and previous Rolls-Royce designs.

Current chief executive Torsten Müller-Ötvös joined the company in January 2010, with a pledge to regain the quality standards that made Rolls-Royce famous. That year sales in China increased by 600%, making it the company's second largest market after the US.

Ownership and licensing of trademarks

In 1998, Vickers decided to sell Rolls-Royce Motors. The most likely buyer was BMW, which already supplied engines and other components for Rolls-Royce and Bentley cars, but BMW's final offer of £340 million was beaten by Volkswagen's £430 million ($703 million).

A stipulation in the ownership documents of Rolls-Royce dictated that Rolls-Royce Holdings plc, the aero-engine maker, would retain certain essential trademarks, including the Rolls-Royce brand name and logo if the automotive division was sold. Although Vickers plc sold the vehicle designs, nameplates, administrative headquarters, production facilities, Spirit of Ecstasy and Rolls-Royce grille shape trademarks to Volkswagen AG, Rolls-Royce plc chose to license the Rolls-Royce name and logo to BMW AG for £40 million ($66 million), because Rolls-Royce plc had recently had joint business ventures with BMW.

BMW's contract to supply engines and components to Rolls-Royce Motors allowed BMW to cancel the contract with 12 months' notice. Volkswagen would be unable to re-engineer the Rolls-Royce and Bentley vehicles to use other engines within that time frame. With the Rolls-Royce brand identification marks split between the two companies and Volkswagen's engine supply in jeopardy, the two companies entered into negotiations. Volkswagen agreed to sell BMW the Spirit of Ecstasy and grille shape trademarks and BMW agreed to continue supplying engines and components until 2003. Volkswagen continued to produce Rolls-Royce branded vehicles between 1998 and 2003. This gave BMW time to build a new Rolls-Royce administrative headquarters and production facility on the Goodwood Estate near Chichester, West Sussex, and develop the Phantom, the first Rolls-Royce from the new company. Rolls-Royce Motor Cars Limited became the exclusive manufacturer of Rolls-Royce branded cars in 2003. Rolls-Royce announced in September 2014 that a new technology and logistics centre would be built, which opened in 2016, 8 miles away from the main headquarters, in the seaside resort town of Bognor Regis.

Products

Current

Phantom 

 Rolls-Royce unveiled a new Phantom at "The Great Eight Phantoms Exhibit", which would go into production at the end of 2017, with sales starting in 2018. This is the current Flagship Model and the most expensive production car made by Rolls-Royce Motor Cars.

Ghost

 From 2010 – Ghost 4-door saloon. Rolls-Royce announced in September 2006 that it would develop a new four-door model named Ghost. The Ghost will be smaller than the previous Rolls-Royce automobile launched, the Phantom. Only 20% of the components would be sourced from BMW F01 7 Series, and it will be positioned below the Phantom.
 On 4 March 2014, the new Ghost Series II was revealed to the public at the Geneva Motor Show. It has a facelift front with new LED headlights. The interior has had an update as well.

Wraith

 From 2013 – Wraith coupé. Rolls-Royce Motor Cars launched a new car at the Geneva Motor Show on 5 March 2013. The new car, named the Rolls-Royce Wraith (in honour of the original Wraith built by the original Rolls-Royce Limited from 1938 to 1939) is a luxury coupe, with a long bonnet and a sleek roof line, and is a coupe version of the Ghost. It is powered by a 623 bhp, twin-turbocharged V12 engine connected to an eight-speed gearbox. It is the fastest car made by Rolls-Royce Motor Cars. Deliveries were expected to begin by the end of 2013. Rolls-Royce had stated that the Wraith would be the most powerful Rolls-Royce motor car to that date.

Dawn 

 From 2015 – Dawn 4-seater convertible. It was announced in time for the 2015 Frankfurt Motor Show.

Cullinan 

 

 After much anticipation, Rolls-Royce revealed the Cullinan in early 2018. The 5-door SUV shares the "Architecture of Luxury" platform and many components with the Phantom.

In Testing

Spectre 

Rolls-Royce's first all-electric car, and its most aerodynamic, the Spectre coupe, is scheduled to begin sales in 2023. It has begun the brand's most demanding testing program in its history, with 2.5 million kilometres, from everyday use to the harshest climates around the world, having already completed tests in Sweden, just 55 kilometres from the Arctic Circle, at temperatures around −40 ˚C and on glacial surfaces.

The Spectre will also introduce a redesigned Spirit of Ecstasy, with one leg forward, a lower, powerful stance, and more realistic, but aerodynamic robes (commonly mistaken as wings).

Former

Phantom

 2003–2016 – Phantom 4-door saloon. Launched in January 2003 at Detroit's North American International Auto Show, this is the first model from Rolls-Royce Motor Cars Limited. The car has a 6.75 L V12 engine sourced from BMW, but most components are unique to the car. Parts are sourced from Continental Europe and the UK. Assembly, leatherwork, woodwork, and finishing are carried out in a new factory in Goodwood near Chichester, Sussex.
 2005–2016 – Rolls-Royce Phantom Extended Wheelbase. This car's wheelbase is 250 mm longer than that of the standard Phantom saloon.
 2007–2016 – Phantom Drophead Coupé (convertible)
 2008–2016 – Phantom Coupé
 2017 – Rolls-Royce Sweptail was a one-off custom Phantom Coupé sold for $12.8 million after a 4-year build  making it the most expensive new car ever sold at the time.

Concept vehicles 
 Rolls-Royce 100EX (2006)
 Rolls-Royce 101EX (2006)
 Rolls-Royce Hyperion (2008)
 Rolls-Royce Mini (June 2009)
 Rolls-Royce 200EX (2009; known as ″RR04″ also)
 Rolls-Royce 102EX (2010)
 Rolls-Royce 103EX (2016)
Rolls Royce Boat Tail (2021) is a custom-built concept car based on its predecessor, the Sweptail. Production limited to three units.

Sales 
The all-time high record of sales (beginning in 2005) was achieved in 2018, at 4,107 cars, topping 2014 sales by 44 cars. In 2011, Rolls-Royce Motor Cars Limited sold 3,538 cars, an increase of 31 percent compared to 2010, beating the previous sales record from 1978. The strong sales growth occurred in the Asia Pacific region, Britain and the Middle East with sales increases of 47 percent, 30 percent and 23 percent respectively.

Charity
In 2014, the company designed a silver coloured Rolls-Royce-themed Paddington Bear statue, one of fifty located around London prior to the release of the film Paddington, which was auctioned to raise funds for the National Society for the Prevention of Cruelty to Children (NSPCC).

See also 
 List of Rolls-Royce motor cars
 List of car manufacturers of the United Kingdom

References

Further reading 
 Richard Feast, Kidnap of the Flying Lady: How Germany Captured Both Rolls Royce and Bentley, Motorbooks (2003), 
 John Rowland and Martin Henley, The Rolls-Royce Men: The Story of Charles Rolls and Henry Royce, Publisher: Lutterworth Press (1968); ASIN: B000COH9WQ

External links 

 
 Rolls-Royce changes gear by Jorn Madslien, BBC News 4 March 2007, 17:55 GMT

 
BMW
English brands
1998 establishments in England
British subsidiaries of foreign companies
Car manufacturers of the United Kingdom
Companies based in West Sussex
Goodwood estate
Luxury motor vehicle manufacturers
Motor vehicle manufacturers of England
Rolls-Royce
Vehicle manufacturing companies established in 1998
Car brands